Pohrebyshche is a small city in Vinnytsia Oblast, Ukraine. It is the administrative center of  Pohrebyshche Raion (district) in western Ukraine. Pohrebyshche is situated near the sources of the Ros River. Population:

Names

History

The town is very old and origin of its name is not clear. Pohreb means a big cellar in Ukrainian. On the other hand, Pohrebaty can be interpreted as to perform a burial. According to Imperial Russian ethnographer Lavrentii Pokhylevych in his work "Tales of inhabited areas of the Kyiv province" in 1884, before the Mongol invasion of Rus, during the times of Kyiv the town was called Rokitnya. Mongols leveled the town leaving only the cellars.

The first time the town was mentioned in written sources was in 1148. For many years it belonged to the Kiev Voivodeship within the Polish–Lithuanian Commonwealth. During the Khmelnytsky Uprising (1648–1657) in 1653 it was completely destroyed by Stefan Czarniecki and in the later wars of the 17th century the town was destroyed by fire and its inhabitants massacred by foreign armies several times. Only around 1720 did a more fortunate period for Pohrebyshche begin. In 1795 the town became part of the Russian Empire.

People
Countess Ewelina Hańska (Rzewuska) a Polish noblewoman (szlachcianka) was born January 6, 1805, in Pohrebyshche. Ewelina was the sister of Henryk Rzewuski. She was married to Wacław Hański, a landowning noble, who was about twenty years older than she was. After his death she married the French novelist Honoré de Balzac in 1850.

The town had a substantial Jewish population. The Jews were murdered during the Second World War by the Nazis and local fascists. In 1928, the large synagogue was converted into a Workman's Club. It was destroyed during the war.

Gallery

Other nearby communities
 Vinnytsia  ENE
 Plyskiv  S
 Borshchahivka  E
 Ruzhyn  N
 Bilylivka  NW
 Samhorodok  W
 Tetiiv  ESE
 Lypovets  SSW
 Zhyvotivka  SE
 Vakhnivka  WSW
 Skvyra  NE
 Koziatyn  NW
 Illintsi  S
 Pavoloch  NNE
 Volodarka  E
 Balabanivka  SSE
 Berdychiv  SE

References

External links
 The murder of the Jews of Pohrebyshche during World War II, at Yad Vashem website.

Cities in Vinnytsia Oblast
Berdichevsky Uyezd
Shtetls
Cities of district significance in Ukraine
Holocaust locations in Ukraine